Andamooka Airport  is an airport in Andamooka, South Australia, Australia.

See also
 List of airports in South Australia

References

Airports in South Australia
Far North (South Australia)